A list of films produced in France in 1981.

Notes

References

External links
 1981 in France
 1981 in French television
 French films of 1981 at the Internet Movie Database
French films of 1981 at Cinema-francais.fr

1981
Films
French